The 1975 John Player League was the seventh competing of what was generally known as the Sunday League.  The competition was won for the first time by Hampshire County Cricket Club.

Standings

Batting averages

Bowling averages

See also
Sunday League

References

1975 in English cricket
Pro40